WYFK (89.5 FM) is a radio station licensed to the community of Columbus, Georgia, United States.  The station is owned by Bible Broadcasting Network, Inc. It airs a conservative religious radio format.

History
This station was granted its original construction permit by the Federal Communications Commission on January 13, 1986. The station was assigned the WYFK call letters by the FCC on January 27, 1986. The station was granted its license to cover on August 29, 1988. The station's long-time promoter Ron Liska died in 2012.

Translators

References

External links

YFK
Bible Broadcasting Network
Radio stations established in 1987
YFK
1987 establishments in Georgia (U.S. state)